Whittaker Chambers (born Jay Vivian Chambers; April 1, 1901 – July 9, 1961) was an American writer–editor, who, after early years as a Communist Party member (1925) and Soviet spy (1932–1938), defected from the Soviet underground (1938), worked for Time magazine (1939–1948), and then testified about the Ware Group in what became the Hiss case for perjury (1949–1950), often referred to as the trial of the century, all described in his 1952 memoir Witness. Afterwards, he worked as a senior editor at National Review (1957–1959). US President Ronald Reagan awarded him the Presidential Medal of Freedom posthumously in 1984.

Background

Chambers was born in Philadelphia, Pennsylvania, and spent his infancy in Brooklyn. His family moved to Lynbrook, Long Island, New York State, in 1904, where he grew up and attended school. His parents were Jay Chambers and Laha Whittaker. He described his childhood as troubled because of his parents' separation and their need to care for their mentally-ill grandmother. His father was an artist and member of the Decorative Designers; his mother was last a social worker. Chambers's brother, Richard Godfrey Chambers committed suicide shortly after he had withdrawn from college at age 22. Chambers cited his brother's fate as one of many reasons that he was then drawn to communism. As he wrote, it "offered me what nothing else in the dying world had power to offer at the same intensity, faith and a vision, something for which to live and something for which to die."

Education
After graduating from South Side High School in neighboring Rockville Centre in 1919, Chambers worked itinerantly in Washington and New Orleans, briefly attended Williams College and then enrolled as a day student at Columbia College of Columbia University. At Columbia, his undergraduate peers included Meyer Schapiro, Frank S. Hogan, Herbert Solow, Louis Zukofsky, Arthur F. Burns, Clifton Fadiman, Elliott V. Bell, John Gassner, Lionel Trilling (who later fictionalized him as a main character in his novel The Middle of the Journey), Guy Endore, and City College student poet Henry Zolinsky. In the intellectual environment of Columbia, he gained friends and respect. His professors and fellow students found him a talented writer and believed he might become a major poet or novelist.

In his sophomore year, Chambers joined the Boar's Head Society and wrote a play called A Play for Puppets for Columbia's literary magazine The Morningside, which he edited. The work was deemed blasphemous by many students and administrators, and the controversy spread to New York City newspapers. Later, the play would be used against Chambers during his testimony against Hiss. Disheartened over the controversy, Chambers left Columbia in 1925. From Columbia, Chambers also knew Isaiah Oggins, who went into the Soviet underground a few years earlier; Chambers's wife, Esther Shemitz Chambers, knew Oggins's wife, Nerma Berman Oggins, from the Rand School of Social Science, the International Ladies' Garment Workers' Union, and The World Tomorrow.

Communism espionage
In 1924, Chambers read Vladimir Lenin's Soviets at Work and was deeply affected by it. He now saw the dysfunctional nature of his family, he would write, as "in miniature the whole crisis of the middle class", a malaise from which communism promised liberation. Chambers's biographer Sam Tanenhaus wrote that Lenin's authoritarianism was "precisely what attracts Chambers. ... He had at last found his church." Chambers became a Marxist and, in 1925, joined the Communist Party of the United States (CPUSA), then known as the Workers Party of America.

Career

Communist
Chambers wrote and edited for the magazine The New Masses and was an editor for The Daily Worker newspaper from 1927 to 1929.

Combining his literary talents with his devotion to communism, Chambers wrote four short stories for New Masses in 1931 about proletarian hardship and revolt, including Can You Make Out Their Voices?, which was considered by critics as one of the best pieces of fiction of American communism. Hallie Flanagan co-adapted and produced it as a play entitled Can You Hear Their Voices? (see Bibliography of Whittaker Chambers), staged across America and in many other countries. Chambers also worked as a translator, his works including the English version of Felix Salten's 1923 novel Bambi, A Life in the Woods.

Soviet underground

Ware group

Chambers was recruited to join the "communist underground" and began his career as a spy, working for a GRU (Main Intelligence Directorate) spy ring headed by Alexander Ulanovsky, also known as Ulrich. Later, his main handler was Josef Peters, who was replaced by CPUSA General Secretary Earl Browder with Rudy Baker. Chambers claimed that Peters introduced him to Harold Ware (although he later denied Peters had ever been introduced to Ware, and also testified to HUAC that he, Chambers, never knew Ware). Chambers claimed that Ware was head of a communist underground cell in Washington that reportedly included the following:

Apart from Marion Bachrach, these individuals were all members of Franklin Roosevelt's New Deal administration. Chambers worked in Washington as an organizer in communists in the city and as a courier between New York and Washington for stolen documents, which were delivered to Boris Bykov, the GRU station chief.

Other covert sources
Using the codename "Karl" or "Carl", Chambers served during the mid-1930s as a courier between various covert sources and Soviet intelligence. In addition to the Ware group mentioned above, other sources that Chambers alleged to have dealt with included the following:

Defection

Chambers carried on his espionage activities from 1932 until 1937 or 1938 even while his faith in communism was waning. He became increasingly disturbed by Joseph Stalin's Great Purge, which began in 1936. He was also fearful for his own life since he had noted the murder in Switzerland of Ignace Reiss, a high-ranking Soviet spy who had broken with Stalin, and the disappearance of Chambers's friend and fellow spy Juliet Stuart Poyntz in the United States. Poyntz had vanished in 1937, shortly after she had visited Moscow and returned disillusioned with the communist cause because of the Stalinist Purges.

Chambers ignored several orders that he travel to Moscow since he worried that he might be "purged". He also started concealing some of the documents he collected from his sources. He planned to use them, along with several rolls of microfilm photographs of documents, as a "life preserver" to prevent the Soviets from killing him and his family.

In 1938, Chambers broke with communism and took his family into hiding. He stored the "life preserver" at the home of his wife's sister, whose son Nathan Levine was Chambers's lawyer. Initially, he had no plans to give information on his espionage activities to the U.S. government. His espionage contacts were his friends, and he had no desire to inform on them.

In his examination of Chambers's conversion from the left to the right, author Daniel Oppenheimer noted that Chambers substituted his passion for communism with a passion for God and saw the world in black-and-white terms both before and after his defection. In his autobiography, Chambers presented his devotion to communism as a reason for living, but after his defection, he saw his actions as being part of an "absolute evil".

Berle meeting

The August 1939 Molotov–Ribbentrop Pact drove Chambers to take action against the Soviet Union. In September 1939, at the urging of the anticommunist Russian-born journalist Isaac Don Levine, Chambers and Levine met with Assistant Secretary of State Adolf A. Berle. Levine had introduced Chambers to Walter Krivitsky, who was already informing American and British authorities about Soviet agents who held posts in both governments. Krivitsky told Chambers that it was their duty to inform. Chambers agreed to reveal what he knew on the condition of immunity from prosecution. During the meeting, which took place at Berle's home, Woodley Mansion, in Washington, Chambers named several current and former government employees as spies or communist sympathizers. Many names mentioned held relatively minor posts or were already under suspicion. Some names, however, were more significant and surprising: Alger Hiss, his brother Donald Hiss, and Laurence Duggan, who were all respected, mid-level officials in the State Department, and Lauchlin Currie, a special assistant to Franklin Roosevelt. Another person named, Vincent Reno, had worked on a top secret bombsight project at the Aberdeen Proving Grounds.

Berle found Chambers's information tentative, unclear, and uncorroborated. He took the information to the White House, but President Franklin Roosevelt dismissed it to which Berle made little if any objection. Berle kept his notes, however, which were later used as evidence during Hiss's perjury trials.

Berle notified the Federal Bureau of Investigation of Chambers's information in March 1940. In February 1941, Krivitsky was found dead in his hotel room. Police ruled the death a suicide, but it was widely speculated that Krivitsky had been killed by Soviet intelligence. Worried that the Soviets might try to kill Chambers too, Berle again told the FBI about his interview with Chambers. The FBI interviewed Chambers in May 1942 and June 1945 but took no immediate action in line with the political orientation of the United States, which viewed the potential threat from the Soviet Union as minor compared to that of Nazi Germany. Only in November 1945, when Elizabeth Bentley defected and corroborated much of Chambers's story, would the FBI begin to take Chambers seriously.

Time

During the Berle meeting, Chambers had come out of hiding after a year and joined the staff of Time (April 1939). He landed a cover story within a month on James Joyce's latest book, Finnegans Wake. He started at the back of the magazine, reviewing books and film with James Agee and then Calvin Fixx. When Fixx suffered a heart attack in October 1942, Wilder Hobson succeeded him as Chambers's assistant editor in Arts & Entertainment. Other writers working for Chambers in that section included novelist Nigel Dennis, future New York Times Book Review editor Harvey Breit, and poets Howard Moss and Weldon Kees.

A struggle had arisen between those, like Theodore H. White and Richard Lauterbach, who raised criticism of what they saw as the elitism, corruption and ineptitude of Chiang Kai-shek's regime in China and advocated greater co-operation with Mao's Red Army in the struggle against Japanese imperialism, and Chambers and others like Willi Schlamm who adhered to a perspective that was staunchly pro-Chiang, anticommunist, and both later joined the founding editorial board of William F. Buckley, Jr.'s National Review. Time founder Henry Luce, who grew up in China and was a personal friend of Chiang and his wife, Soong Mei-ling, came down squarely on the side of Chambers to the point that White complained that his stories were being censored and even suppressed in their entirety, and he left Time shortly after the war as a result.

In 1940, William Saroyan lists Fixx among "contributing editors" at Time in Saroyan's play, Love's Old Sweet Song. Luce promoted him senior editor in either summer 1942 (Weinstein) or September 1943 (Tanenhaus) and became a member of Time "Senior Group", which determined editorial policy, in December 1943.

Chambers, close colleagues, and many staff members in the 1930s helped elevate Time and have been called "interstitial intellectuals" by the historian Robert Vanderlan. His colleague John Hersey described them as follows:

Time was in an interesting phase; an editor named Tom Matthews had gathered a brilliant group of writers, including James Agee, Robert Fitzgerald, Whittaker Chambers, Robert Cantwell, Louis Kronenberger, and Calvin Fixx. ... They were dazzling. Time style was still very hokey—"backward ran sentences till reeled the mind"—but I could tell, even as a neophyte, who had written each of the pieces in the magazine, because each of these writers had such a distinctive voice.

By early 1948, Chambers had become one of the best known writer-editors at Time. First had come his scathing commentary "The Ghosts on the Roof" (March 5, 1945) on the Yalta Conference in which Hiss partook. Subsequent cover-story essays profiled Marian Anderson, Arnold J. Toynbee, Rebecca West and Reinhold Niebuhr. The cover story on Marian Anderson ("Religion: In Egypt Land", December 30, 1946) proved so popular that the magazine broke its rule of non-attribution in response to readers' letters:

Most Time cover stories are written and edited by the regular staffs of the section in which they appear. Certain cover stories, that present special difficulties or call for a special literary skill, are written by Senior Editor Whittaker Chambers.

In a 1945 letter to Time colleague Charles Wertenbaker, Time-Life deputy editorial director John Shaw Billings said of Chambers, "Whit puts on the best show in words of any writer we've ever had ... a superb technician, particularly skilled in the mosaic art of putting a Time section together." Chambers was at the height of his career when the Hiss case broke later that year.

Meanwhile, Chambers and his family became Quakers, attending Pipe Creek Friends Meetinghouse near his Maryland farm.

Hiss case

On August 3, 1948, Chambers was called to testify before the House Un-American Activities Committee (HUAC), where he gave the names of individuals he said were part of the underground "Ware group" in the late 1930s, including Alger Hiss. He once again named Hiss as a member of the Communist Party but did not yet make any accusations of espionage. In subsequent sessions, Hiss testified and initially denied that he knew anyone by the name of Chambers, but on seeing him in person and after it became clear that Chambers knew details about Hiss's life, Hiss said that he had known Chambers under the name "George Crosley". Hiss denied that he had ever been a communist, however. Since Chambers still presented no evidence, the committee had initially been inclined to take the word of Hiss on the matter. However, a committee member, Richard Nixon, received secret information from the FBI that had led him to pursue the issue. When it issued its report, HUAC described Hiss's testimony as "vague and evasive".

"Red Herring"

The country quickly became divided over Hiss and Chambers. President Harry S. Truman, not pleased with the allegation that the man who had presided over the United Nations Charter Conference was a communist, dismissed the case as a "red herring".
In the atmosphere of increasing anticommunism that would later be termed McCarthyism, many conservatives viewed the Hiss case as emblematic of what they saw as Democrats' laxity towards the danger of communist infiltration and influence in the State Department. Many liberals, in turn, saw the Hiss case as part of the desperation of the Republican Party to regain the office of president since it had been out of power for 16 years. Truman also issued Executive Order 9835, which initiated a program of loyalty reviews for federal employees in 1947.

"Pumpkin Papers"
Hiss filed a $75,000 libel suit against Chambers on October 8, 1948. Under pressure from Hiss's lawyers, Chambers finally retrieved his envelope of evidence and presented it to the HUAC after it had subpoenaed them. It contained four notes in Hiss's handwriting, 65 typewritten copies of State Department documents and five strips of microfilm, some of which contained photographs of State Department documents. The press came to call these the "Pumpkin Papers" since Chambers had briefly hidden the microfilm in a hollowed-out pumpkin. The documents indicated that Hiss knew Chambers long after mid-1936, when Hiss said he had last seen "Crosley", and also that Hiss had engaged in espionage with Chambers. Chambers explained his delay in producing the evidence as an effort to spare an old friend from more trouble than necessary. Until October 1948, Chambers had repeatedly stated that Hiss had not engaged in espionage, even when Chambers testified under oath. Chambers was forced to testify at the Hiss trials that he had committed perjury several times, which reduced his credibility in the eyes of his critics.

The five rolls of 35 mm film known as the "pumpkin papers" were thought until late 1974 to be locked in HUAC files. The independent researcher Stephen W. Salant, an economist at the University of Michigan, sued the U.S. Justice Department in 1975 when his request for access to them under the Freedom of Information Act was denied. On July 31, 1975, as a result of this lawsuit and follow-on suits filed by Peter Irons and by Alger Hiss and William Reuben, the Justice Department released copies of the "pumpkin papers" that had been used to implicate Hiss. One roll of film turned out to be totally blank because of overexposure, two others are faintly-legible copies of nonclassified Navy Department documents relating to such subjects as life rafts and fire extinguishers, and the remaining two are photographs of the State Department documents introduced by the prosecution at the two Hiss trials, relating to US-German relations in the late 1930s.

That story, however, as reported by The New York Times in the 1970s, contains only a partial truth. The blank roll had been mentioned by Chambers in his autobiography, Witness. However, in addition to innocuous farm reports, the documents on the other pumpkin patch microfilms also included "confidential memos sent from overseas embassies to diplomatic staff in Washington, D.C." Worse, those memos had originally been transmitted in code, which, thanks to their presumable possession of both coded originals and the translations (claimed by Chambers, to be forwarded by Hiss), the Soviets now could easily understand.

In taped recordings of President Nixon on July 1, 1971, he admitted that he had not checked the Pumpkin Papers prior to their use and he felt that the Justice Department was out to exonerate Hiss and a federal grand jury would indict Nixon's ally Chambers for perjury. The FBI continued investigating Hiss's innocence into 1953.

Perjury

Hiss was indicted for two counts of perjury relating to testimony he had given before a federal grand jury the previous December. He had denied giving any documents to Chambers and testified that he had not seen Chambers after mid-1936.

Hiss was tried twice for perjury. The first trial, in June 1949, ended with the jury deadlocked 8–4 for conviction. In addition to Chambers's testimony, a government expert testified that other papers typed on a typewriter belonging to the Hiss family matched the secret papers produced by Chambers. An impressive array of character witnesses appeared on behalf of Hiss: two Supreme Court justices, Felix Frankfurter and Stanley Reed, the former Democratic presidential nominee John W. Davis, and the future Democratic presidential nominee Adlai Stevenson. Chambers, on the other hand, was attacked by Hiss's attorneys as "an enemy of the Republic, a blasphemer of Christ, a disbeliever in God, with no respect for matrimony or motherhood". In the second trial, Hiss's defense produced a psychiatrist who characterized Chambers as a "psychopathic personality" and "a pathological liar".

The second trial ended in January 1950 with Hiss being found guilty on both counts of perjury. He was sentenced to five years in prison.

Chambers had resigned from Time in December 1948. After the Hiss case, he wrote a few articles for Fortune, Life, and Look magazines.

In 1951, during the HUAC hearings, William Spiegel of Baltimore identified a photo of "Carl Schroeder" as Chambers while Spiegel was describing his involvement with David Zimmerman, a spy in Chambers's network.

Witness
In 1952, Chambers's book Witness was published to widespread acclaim. It was a combination of autobiography and a warning about the dangers of communism. Arthur M. Schlesinger Jr. called it "a powerful book". Ronald Reagan credited the book as the inspiration behind his conversion from a New Deal Democrat to a conservative Republican. Witness was a bestseller for more than a year and helped to pay off Chambers's legal debts, but bills lingered ("as Odysseus was beset by a ghost").

According to the commentator George Will in 2017:
Witness became a canonical text of conservatism. Unfortunately, it injected conservatism with a sour, whiney, complaining, crybaby populism. It is the screechy and dominant tone of the loutish faux conservatism that today is erasing [William F.] Buckley's legacy of infectious cheerfulness and unapologetic embrace of high culture. Chambers wallowed in cloying sentimentality and curdled resentment about "the plain men and women"—"my people, humble people, strong in common sense, in common goodness"—enduring the "musk of snobbism" emanating from the "socially formidable circles" of the "nicest people" produced by "certain collegiate eyries".

National Review

In 1955, William F. Buckley Jr. started the magazine National Review, and Chambers worked there as senior editor, publishing articles there for a little over a year and a half (October 1957 – June 1959). The most widely cited article to date is a scathing review, "Big Sister is Watching You", of Ayn Rand's Atlas Shrugged.

In 1959, after resigning from National Review, Chambers and his wife embarked on a visit to Europe, the highlight of which was a meeting with Arthur Koestler and Margarete Buber-Neumann at Koestler's home in Austria. That fall, he recommenced studies at Western Maryland College (now McDaniel College) in Westminster, Maryland.

Personal life and death
In 1930 or 1931, Chambers married the artist Esther Shemitz (1900–1986). Shemitz, who had studied at the Art Students League and integrated herself into New York City's intellectual circles, met Chambers at the 1926 textile strike at Passaic, New Jersey. They then underwent a courtship that faced resistance from her mentor comrade Grace Hutchins. Shemitz identified as "a pacifist rather than a revolutionary". In the 1920s, she worked for The World Tomorrow, a pacifist magazine.

The couple had two children, Ellen and John, during the 1930s. Some Communist leadership expected professional revolutionists to go childless, the couple refused, a choice he cited as part of his gradual disillusionment with communism. His daughter Ellen died in 2017.

In 1978, Allen Weinstein's Perjury revealed that the FBI has a copy of a letter in which Chambers described homosexual liaisons during the 1930s. The letter copy states that Chambers gave up the practices in 1938 when he left the underground, which he attributed to his newfound Christianity. The letter has remained controversial from many perspectives.

Chambers died of a heart attack on July 9, 1961, at his  farm in Westminster, Maryland. He had had angina since the age of 38 and had several heart attacks.

Awards

 1952 – Honorary Doctorate of Law from Mount Mary College (Milwaukee)
 1953 – National Book Award finalist for nonfiction (Witness)
 1984 – Presidential Medal of Freedom (posthumously) (for contribution to "the century's epic struggle between freedom and totalitarianism")

Legacy

In 2007, John Chambers stated that a library with his father's papers should open in 2008 on the Chambers farm in Maryland. He indicated that the facility will be available to all scholars and that a separate library, rather than one within an established university, is needed to guarantee open access.

In 2011, author Elena Maria Vidal interviewed David Chambers about his grandfather's legacy. Versions of the interview were published in the National Observer and The American Conservative.

Presidential Medal of Freedom (1984)

In 1984, President Ronald Reagan posthumously awarded Chambers the Presidential Medal of Freedom, for his contribution to "the century's epic struggle between freedom and totalitarianism". In 1988, Interior Secretary Donald P. Hodel granted national landmark status to the Pipe Creek Farm. In 2001, members of the George W. Bush administration held a private ceremony to commemorate the hundredth anniversary of Chambers's birth. Speakers included William F. Buckley, Jr.

Shortlived "Whittaker Chambers Award" (2017–2019)
In January 2017, the National Review Institute (NRI) inaugurated a "Whittaker Chambers Award" for its 2017 Ideas Summit.

Recipients:
 Daniel Hannan: On March 16, 2017, the first recipient was Daniel Hannan MEP, dubbed "the man who brought you Brexit" by The Guardian. 
 Mark Janus: In February 2019, NRI announced its second biennial winner of the award, Mark Janus. Supporters say Janus champions free speech; detractors say he seeks to erode public unions by enabling free rides.

In March 2019, The Wall Street Journal reported strong opposition from the family of Whittaker Chambers. It quoted from a family statement:   "All of us agree: the efforts of the two awardees run counter to the instincts and experience of Whittaker Chambers. All of us agree: their efforts have not matched his."   Chambers's son said that the two awardees "are way, way off the target of the man whose name goes along with the award". One grandchild said, "I almost thought, well, 'Gosh, did the National Review guys read his book?'" Regarding the award to Daniel Hannan, another grandchild said, "My grandfather would have been horrified" by a Brexiteer who sought to divide the West (the European Union), as if it were a favor to the "very Stalin-like" Vladimir Putin. Regarding the anti-union Mark Janus, the family noted that Chambers's wife, Esther Shemitz, had been a member of the International Ladies' Garment Workers' Union and that other family members were active in unions, including Chambers himself in the Newspaper Guild.

In response, National Review conceded, "We don't own the Chambers name". While it refused the family's request to withdraw the two awards, it did agree to discontinue it. It also agreed to publish the Chambers' statement on its website the weekend after the award.

After National Review did not publish on time as promised, the family published themselves ("Withdraw Whittaker").

(Christopher Buckley, author and son of William F. Buckley Jr., supported the Chambers family with a similar story about the William F. Buckley Jr. Award for Media Excellence: when Media Research Center awarded Sean Hannity, Buckley objected, the center rescinded the award, and stopped making the award altogether.)

Proposed Whittaker Chambers monument (2020)

In September 2020, two senators from Carroll County to the Maryland General Assembly, Justin Ready and Michael Hough, announced their intention, reported in the Carroll County Times to recommend a "Whittaker Chambers Memorial" for a "National Garden of American Heroes, following an executive order by Donald J. Trump to create an Interagency Task Force for Building and Rebuilding Monuments to American Heroes to establish that garden. Two members of the Whittaker Chambers family also wrote the Carroll County Times to say thank you but no to the senators intention:Whittaker Chambers sought a simple life of farming the Pipe Creek Farm. He was a Quaker. His beliefs ran toward austerity and self-effacement. Quaker meeting houses stand unadorned, without monuments or statues. He would not have liked such fanfare.The best way to remember our grandfather is to read his books. They are his memoir Witness (1952) and his later writings in Cold Friday (1964). Rather than a monument, he left testimony to read.As President Ronald Reagan said, when posthumously presenting the Medal of Freedom to him in 1984, "The witness is gone; the testimony will stand."

Works
See Bibliography of Whittaker Chambers

In 1928, Chambers translated Bambi, a Life in the Woods, by Felix Salten, into English.

Chambers's book Witness is on the reading lists of The Heritage Foundation, The Weekly Standard, The Leadership Institute, and the Russell Kirk Center for Cultural Renewal. He is regularly cited by conservative writers such as Heritage's president Edwin Feulner and George H. Nash.

Cold Friday, Chambers's second memoir, was published posthumously in 1964 with the help of Duncan Norton-Taylor. The book predicted that the fall of communism would start in the satellite states surrounding the Soviet Union in Eastern Europe. A collection of his correspondence with William F. Buckley, Jr., Odyssey of a Friend, was published in 1968; a collection of his journalism—including several of his Time and National Review writings, was published in 1989 as Ghosts on the Roof: Selected Journalism of Whittaker Chambers.

See also

 Whittaker Chambers - Wikiquote
 Witness (memoir) 
 Bibliography of Whittaker Chambers
 History of Soviet espionage in the United States
 List of Presidential Medal of Freedom recipients
 List of American spies
 John Abt
 Jacob Burck
 Chambers (surname)
 Noel Field
 Harold Glasser
 John Herrmann
 Alger Hiss
 Donald Hiss
 Nathan Levine
 Victor Perlo
 J. Peters
 Ward Pigman
 Lee Pressman
 Vincent Reno
 Esther Shemitz
 Reuben Shemitz
 Julian Wadleigh
 Harold Ware
 Nathaniel Weyl
 Harry Dexter White
 Nathan Witt

References

Further reading

External links

 
 Authors Guild
 
 
 
 
 
 , 
 
 Truman Library: Transcripts of Grand Jury Testimony in the Alger Hiss Case Record Group 118

1901 births
1961 deaths
Writers from Philadelphia
Members of the Communist Party USA
American spies for the Soviet Union
Espionage in the United States
Admitted Soviet spies
American communists
American Quakers
Bisexual men
Converts to Quakerism
Critics of Objectivism (Ayn Rand)
Former Marxists
Presidential Medal of Freedom recipients
Columbia College (New York) alumni
McCarthyism
People from Westminster, Maryland
People from Lynbrook, New York
National Review people
Time (magazine) people
American male non-fiction writers
20th-century American non-fiction writers
American people in the Venona papers
South Side High School (Rockville Centre) alumni
American anti-communists
20th-century American male writers
20th-century Quakers